A seaside is the marine coast of a sea.

 A seaside resort is a resort on or near a sea coast.

Seaside may also refer to:

Places
Canada
 Seaside Park, British Columbia, also known as Seaside
United Kingdom
 A mostly undeveloped coastal area in Perth and Kinross (central Scotland) called Seaside
 Seaside, Carmarthenshire, a coastal settlement in Wales
United States
 Seaside, California
 Seaside, Florida, one of the first communities in the United States designed on the principles of New Urbanism
 Seaside, Oregon
 Seaside, Queens, a section of Rockaway Beach in New York City
 Seaside Heights, New Jersey
 Seaside Park, New Jersey

Transport
 The Kanazawa Seaside Line, a people mover line in Yokohama, Japan
Seaside station (LIRR Montauk Line), a  name briefly given to the 1867-built Babylon (LIRR station) along the Montauk Branch between 1868 and 1869
Seaside station (LIRR Rockaway Beach), the original name for what is today the Beach 105th Street (IND Rockaway Line) on the former Rockaway Beach Branch from 1880 to 1955
 The Seasider, a tourist train in the  South Island of New Zealand

Music
 Seaside, a 2015 jazz album by Liane Carroll
“The Seaside”, a song from Janis Ian’s 1971 album Present Company
 “Seaside”, a song from The Ordinary Boys’ 2004 album Over the Counter Culture
 “Seaside”, a song by The Kooks from their 2006 album Inside In / Inside Out
 “Seaside Rendezvous”, a song by British rock group Queen, which is on their studio album A Night at the Opera
 “Seaside Woman”, a 1977 single by Linda McCartney and Wings (as Suzy and the Red Stripes)

Other
 Seaside (software), a framework for developing web applications in Smalltalk
 Seaside (film), a 2002 French drama film
 SM Seaside, a shopping mall in Cebu City, Philippines
 Seaside Hotel, a Danish drama and comedy series
 Seaside Special, a BBC light entertainment show